Lowi may refer to:

Theodore J. Lowi (1931–2017), American political scientist
Innsbruck Airport, Austria (ICAO code: LOWI)

See also
Lowy
Loewy